Séamus Hogan (born c.1947 in Kildangan, County Tipperary) is an Irish retired sportsperson.  He played hurling with his local club Kildangan and was a member of the Tipperary senior inter-county team in the 1960s and 1970s. Hogan won his sole set of All-Ireland and Munster winners' medals with Tipp in 1971.

References

1940s births
Living people
Kildangan hurlers (Tipperary)
Tipperary inter-county hurlers
All-Ireland Senior Hurling Championship winners